Isabel Martínez (born 28 December 1972) is a Spanish long-distance runner. She competed in the women's 5000 metres at the 1996 Summer Olympics.

References

1972 births
Living people
Athletes (track and field) at the 1996 Summer Olympics
Spanish female long-distance runners
Olympic athletes of Spain
Place of birth missing (living people)